The Ocean City School District is a comprehensive community public school district that serves students in pre-kindergarten through twelfth grade from Ocean City, in Cape May County, New Jersey.

As of the 2020–21 school year, the district, comprised of three schools, had an enrollment of 2,056 students and 220.4 classroom teachers (on an FTE basis), for a student–teacher ratio of 9.3:1.

Public school students from Corbin City, Longport, Sea Isle City and Upper Township attend Ocean City High School for ninth through twelfth grades as part of sending/receiving relationships with their respective school districts.

The district is classified by the New Jersey Department of Education as being in District Factor Group "DE", the fifth-highest of eight groupings. District Factor Groups organize districts statewide to allow comparison by common socioeconomic characteristics of the local districts. From lowest socioeconomic status to highest, the categories are A, B, CD, DE, FG, GH, I and J.

History
By 1948, schools in Ocean City were racially integrated. At the time all teachers were white.

Merger discussions with the Sea Isle City School District in 2008 ended after the Ocean City district indicated that it did want to accept Sea Isle City's tenured teachers, which it would be required to do under state law. Sea Isle City currently spends $35,000 per student and hoped to see savings through the merger, even after adding in transportation costs. The Sea Isle City district graduated its last eighth grade class in June 2009 and with the 2010-11 school year, students from Sea Isle City started attending the Ocean City schools starting in fifth grade. As of June 30, 2012, Sea Isle City School District no longer operates, in the face of an order by the Commissioner of the New Jersey Department of Education that was based on declining enrollment and budgetary issues. All students from Sea Isle City in public school for pre-Kindergarten through twelfth grade attend Ocean City Public Schools.

Schools
Schools in the district (with 2020–21 enrollment data from the National Center for Education Statistics) are:
Elementary schools
Ocean City Primary School with 299 students in grades PreK-3
Dr. Cathleen Smith, Principal 
Ocean City Intermediate School with 468 students in grades 4-8
Michael Mattina, Principal
High school
Ocean City High School with 1,274 students in grades 9-12
Dr. Wendy O’Neal, Acting Principal

Administration
Core members of the district's administration are:
Dr. Matthew Friedman, Superintendent
Timothy E. Kelley, Business Administrator / Board Secretary

Board of education
The district's board of education is comprised of nine elected members, plus three appointed representatives from Upper Township, who set policy and oversee the fiscal and educational operation of the district through its administration. As a Type II school district, the board's nine trustees are elected directly by Ocean City's voters to serve three-year terms of office on a staggered basis, with three seats up for election each year held (since 2012) as part of the November general election. Members from Upper Township and non-voting members from Longport and Sea Isle City are appointed by their districts to one-year terms of office. The board appoints a superintendent to oversee the district's day-to-day operations and a business administrator to supervise the business functions of the district.

References

External links
Ocean City School District
 
School Data for the Ocean City School District, National Center for Education Statistics

Ocean City, New Jersey
New Jersey District Factor Group DE
School districts in Cape May County, New Jersey
Upper Township, New Jersey